Chacarita is a district of the Puntarenas canton, in the Puntarenas province of Costa Rica.

History 
Chacarita was created on 18 July 1994 by Ley 7422.

Geography 
Chacarita has an area of  km² and an elevation of  metres.

Demographics 

For the 2011 census, Chacarita had a population of  inhabitants.

Transportation

Road transportation 
The district is covered by the following road routes:
 National Route 17

References 

Districts of Puntarenas Province
Populated places in Puntarenas Province